Funafala is an islet of Funafuti,  Tuvalu that is inhabited by five families, with a church also located on the islet. Funafala means 'the pandanus of Funa', the name of a chief, after whom also the group has been named Funafuti.

Cyclones of 1883 & 1972

George Westbrook, a trader on Funafuti, recorded a Cyclone that struck Funafuti in 1883. At the time the Cyclone struck he was the sole inhabitant of Fongafale as Tema, the Samoan missionary, had taken everyone else to Funafala to work on erecting a church. The buildings on Fongafale were destroyed, including the church and the trade stores of George Westbrook and Alfred Restieaux. Little damage had occurred at Funafala and the people returned to rebuild at Fongafale.

In 1972 Funafuti was in the path of Cyclone Bebe. Tropical Cyclone Bebe was a pre-season tropical cyclone that impacted the Gilbert, Ellice Islands, and Fiji island groups. First spotted on October 20, the system intensified and grew in size through October 22. Cyclone Bebe continued through Sunday 22 October. Cyclone Bebe knocked down 90% of the houses and trees. The cyclone contaminated sources of drinking water as a result of the system's storm surge and flooding.

World War II
During the Pacific War the majority of Tuvaluans living on Fongafale atoll moved to Funafala so as to leave Fongafale as a base for the American forces who occupied much of Fongafale atoll including building the airfield. The hospital was shifted to Funafala atoll for the duration of the war.

References

Islands of Tuvalu
Pacific islands claimed under the Guano Islands Act
Populated places in Tuvalu
Funafuti